Municipality of Mazatlán is a municipality in Sinaloa in northwestern Mexico.

Political subdivision 
Mazatlán Municipality is subdivided in 8 sindicaturas:
Villa Unión
El Recodo
El Quelite
Mármol
El Roble
Siqueros
La Noria
El Habal

References

Municipalities of Sinaloa

External links